The women's triple jump at the 2018 Commonwealth Games, as part of the athletics programme, took place in Carrara Stadium on 10 April 2018. Bronze medalist Thea LaFond was the first Dominican athlete to win a medal at the Commonwealth Games.

Records
Prior to this competition, the existing world and Games records were as follows:

Schedule
The schedule was as follows:

All times are Australian Eastern Standard Time (UTC+10)

Results
With twelve entrants, the event was held as a straight final.

Final

References

Women's triple jump
2018
2018 in women's athletics